Sven-Olov Eriksson (22 April 1929 – 31 October 1999) was a Swedish runner who specialized in the 400 m hurdles event. He competed at the 1952 Summer Olympics, but failed to reach the final.

References

1929 births
1999 deaths
Swedish male hurdlers
Olympic athletes of Sweden
Athletes (track and field) at the 1952 Summer Olympics